This is a '''list of universities in Chad.

Universities in Chad
Université Adam Barka d'Abéché, Abeche
Université de N'Djamena, N'Djamena
Université de Doba, Doba

References

External links
Universities in Chad

Chad
Chad
Universities